Parade II -Respective Tracks of Buck-Tick- is the second tribute album to Japanese rock band Buck-Tick, released on July 4, 2012. The album reached number 14 on Billboard Japan Top Albums and number 16 on the Oricon chart.

Produced in celebration of the band's 25 anniversary, it collects cover versions of their songs by various artists. The cover art was created by Hiroshi Ueda, illustrator of the manga Full Metal Panic! Σ and Tiger & Bunny: The Comic.

The first tribute album, Parade -Respective Tracks of Buck-Tick-, was released on December 21, 2005. Like the first album, the second was also supported with a festival that included the artists featured on the album; held on September 22–23, 2012. A home video of the two-day event was released on February 20, 2013.

Track listing

References

External links
 Official Facebook page for the album

Buck-Tick albums
Tribute albums
2012 compilation albums